Maes Pils was a Belgian professional cycling team that existed from 1966 to 1977. Its most notable result was Walter Planckaert's win of the 1976 Tour of Flanders.

References

External links

Cycling teams based in Belgium
Defunct cycling teams based in Belgium
1966 establishments in Belgium
1977 disestablishments in Belgium
Cycling teams established in 1966
Cycling teams disestablished in 1977